The Spectator is a  2004 Italian romance-drama film written and directed by Paolo Franchi. It was screened at the 2004 Tribeca Film Festival. The film was paired by several critics with the works by Krzysztof Kieślowski.

Cast 
Barbora Bobuľová - Valeria
Andrea Renzi - Massimo
Brigitte Catillon - Flavia
Chiara Picchi - Sonia
Matteo Mussoni - Andrea
Giorgio Podo - Lo conosciuto pub
Carlotta Centanni - L'agente immobiliare
Cesare Cremonini - Il gufo

See also 
 List of Italian films of 2004

References

External links 
 

2004 films
2000s Italian-language films
2004 romantic drama films
Films directed by Paolo Franchi
2004 directorial debut films
Italian romantic drama films
2000s Italian films